"Voices in My Head" is a song by American rock band Falling in Reverse. It was released on May 31, 2022, through Epitaph Records. The song was released as the second single from the band's upcoming EP Neon Zombie. The song was again produced by DangerKids vocalist Tyler Smyth and frontman Ronnie Radke. The song marks the return of bassist Tyler Burgess to the band.

Promotion and release
The band released the song through Epitaph Records accompanied by a release for their upcoming tour with Papa Roach, Hollywood Undead and Bad Wolves called "Rockzilla Summer Tour". The song reached 12 million streams in just one week on all platforms. In addition, the song reached 1 million views in just one week on YouTube. Like the previous single "Zombified", the song will be part of the band's next EP Neon Zombie, which is expected to be released in late 2022.

Composition and lyrics
The song was composed by Falling in Reverse and was written by vocalist Ronnie Radke and producers/musicians Tyler Smyth of DangerKids, Charles Massabo and Cody Quistad, who had collaborated on previous songs. With "Zombified" taking the music industry and a few political YouTubers by storm, it was only in Ronnie Radke’s willpower to top it up once again, making an event bigger than the last one. With "Voices In My Head", Radke takes it one step further, providing much heavier riffs than "Zombified", which seemed impossible at the time.

Music video
The music video was again directed by Jensen Noen who had directed previous music videos for the band. For the music video, Ronnie wanted to project something different:

Personnel
Falling in Reverse
 Ronnie Radke – lead vocals, programming, producer, additional guitar
 Max Georgiev – lead guitar, backing vocals
 Christian Thompson – rhythm guitar, backing vocals
 Tyler Burgess – bass, backing vocals
Additional personnel
 Tyler Smyth – production, strings, additional writing, recording, mastering, programming, engineered
 Cody Quistad – additional writing, guitars
 Charles Kallaghan Massabo – composer, programming, engineer
 Luke Holland – drums, percussion

Charts

Weekly charts

Year-end charts

References

2022 singles
2022 songs
Falling in Reverse songs
Songs written by Ronnie Radke
Epitaph Records singles